MXI may refer to:
 Computer bus bridge link, MXI link for PCI-to-PXI
 The Roman numeral that is the year 1011
 The IATA code of Mati Airport in Philippines.